Gmina Szczawnica is an urban-rural gmina (administrative district) in Nowy Targ County, Lesser Poland Voivodeship, in southern Poland, near the border with Slovakia. Its seat is the town of Szczawnica.

Until 1 January 2008, Szczawnica was an urban gmina (a town having gmina status). The urban-rural gmina (Gmina Szczawnica) was created when certain settlements which had been within the town's boundaries were designated as villages in their own right. These are Jaworki (including the former villages of Biała Woda and Czarna Woda) and Szlachtowa.

Neighbouring gminas
Gmina Szczawnica is bordered by Gmina Krościenko nad Dunajcem, Gmina Łącko, Gmina Piwniczna-Zdrój, Gmina Rytro and Gmina Stary Sącz.

Szczawnica
Nowy Targ County